Vilkaitis is a Lithuanian surname. Its female forms are Vilkaitienė, Vilkaitytė. Notable people with the surname include:

Aurimas Vilkaitis (born 1993), Lithuanian footballer
Remigijus Vilkaitis (born 1950), Lithuanian actor

Lithuanian-language surnames